Fikret Berkes (born 1945) is a Distinguished Professor Emeritus at the University of Manitoba's Natural Resources Institute. Berkes studies community-based natural resources management in societies around the world.

Career
Berkes earned his PhD in Marine Sciences at McGill University in 1973. In 1974, rather than continuing on with a postdoctoral position in marine ecology, Berkes worked with an anthropologist, Harvey Feit, studying Cree people's fishing.

Berkes taught at Brock University, then became the Director of the NRI at the University of Manitoba in 1991.

Awards

In 2014, Berkes won the Sustainability Science Award of the Ecological Society of America for his third (2012) edition of Sacred Ecology.

He has also been awarded the International Union for Conservation of Nature CEESP Inaugural Award for Meritorious Research (2016) and the IASC Elinor Ostrom Award for Senior Scholar (2015).

Selected publications
Berkes, F. (2017). Sacred Ecology (4th ed.). Routledge. https://doi.org/10.4324/9781315114644
Berkes, F., Colding, J., & Folke, C. (Eds.). (2008). Navigating social-ecological systems: building resilience for complexity and change. Cambridge University Press.
Berkes, F., Colding, J., & Folke, C. (2000). Rediscovery of traditional ecological knowledge as adaptive management. Ecological applications, 10(5), 1251-1262.
Berkes, F., Folke, C., & Colding, J. (Eds.). (2000). Linking social and ecological systems: management practices and social mechanisms for building resilience. Cambridge University Press.

References

External links
 Managing Small-scale Fisheries full-text
 Toward a new social contract full-text

Living people
Academic staff of the University of Manitoba
McGill University alumni
1945 births